State of Grace or L'État de Grace is a 1986 French drama romance film, directed by Jacques Rouffio.

Plot
The film is set in 1980s France during the early years of François Mitterrand's presidency. Florence Vannier-Buchet, a women's rights activist, is happily married to  Protestant banker Jean-Marc Buchet who operates a major sporting goods company.

During a stormy meeting of the Conseil national du patronat français (CNPF; National Council of French Employers), she meets Antoine Lombard, the new Secretary of State for Universities and Socialist Activities, and elected member of the "pink wave." The two become involved in a passionate extramarital romance. They attempt to carry on their affair, fulfil their careers, all while seeking political change.

Cast

 Nicole Garcia as Florence Vannier-Buchet
 Pierre Arditi as Jean-Marc Vannier-Buchet
 Sami Frey as Antoine Lombard
 Dominique Labourier as Jeanne Lombard
 Yvette Etiévant as Madeleine Lombard
 Jean Rougerie as Edmond Lombard
 Catherine Hiegel as Sylvie
 Philippe Léotard as Pierre-Julien
 Yves Pignot as Eric Buppon
 Marc Berman as Weber
 Cécile Mazan as Nathalie
 André Thorent as Florian
 Jean-Eric Grandgérard as Claude
 Catherine Jacob
 Maïwenn

References

External links

1986 films
1980s French-language films
1986 romantic drama films
French romantic drama films
Films scored by Philippe Sarde
Films directed by Jacques Rouffio
1980s French films